Shaikh Muhammad Hussain Najafi (born 1932) is a Pakistani Twelver Shia Marja. As of current, there are two maraji of Pakistani descent. The first one is he himself and the second one is Basheer Hussain Najafi. As Basheer Hussain Najafi has chosen to reside in Najaf, Iraq, Muhammad Hussain Najafi is the only marja in Pakistan. He is running a Hawza in Sargodha.

He has been included in the last 5 editions of "The Muslim 500: The World's Most Influential Muslims" since 2010. He is one of the 9 marja's mentioned in the most recent edition.

Childhood and family
Muhammad Hussain was born in small town of Jehania shah in Sargodha District of Punjab province of Pakistan in April 1932. He had two paternal uncles, both of whom were Shia ulema: Maulana Imam Bakhsh was a religious teacher in Jahanian Shah, while Maulana Sohrab Ali Khan was a reputed alim of Uch Sharif. His father Rana Tajuddin was not an alim, but he had the wish of making his son a great alim. However, he died in 1944 when Muhammad Hussain was 12 years old, after which the family members persuaded the widow that Muhammad Hussain should look after the family lands, but she kept up the wish of her dead husband.

Early education in Pakistan
After secondary school education, he got an admission in Madrasah Muhammadia in Jalalpur Nankiana, Sargodha, where one of his prominent teachers was Ayatollah Allama Hussain Bakhsh Jarra. In 1947, he studied the courses of Dars-i-Nizami from Ayatollah Allama Muhammad Baqir Naqvi in Jhang. Allama Baqir Naqvi had migrated from Iraq to spread Shia formal education in Pakistan. Since (the First Biggest prominent Shia scholar in Pakistan Ustad ul ulama) Grand Ayatollah Allama Syed Muhammad Yar Shah Naqvi Najfi, the most prominent disciple of Allama Baqir Naqvi, had moved from his ancestral city Alipur to Jalalpur, Muhammad Hussain moved to Jalalpur to complete Dars-i-Nizami for the next five years. In 1953, he passed the examination of Molvi Fazil from Punjab University, and moved to Najaf in 1954 for higher education.

Marital life
Before going to Najaf for higher religious education, he was married to his maternal cousin in 1952. His teacher Allama Yar Shah had links with ulema of Najaf, and he wanted Muhammad Hussain to get married in a scholarly family of Najaf, but Muhammad Hussain declined this proposal due to cultural differences.
In 1954, his only son Muhammad Sibtain was born. At the age of five, he got seriously ill and died, as Muhammad Hussain did not have enough money for his treatment. (Muhammad Hussain used to spend his stipend money on household and buying books.)
After Sibtain's death, Ayatollah Najafi did not have children for the next eleven years, later he had one daughter. He married the daughter of Haji Muhammad Shafi (Faisalabad) in 1970. He had two daughters from this marriage. His first wife died in 1996.

Education at Hawza Elmiye Najaf

In 1954, he moved to Hawza Elmiye Najaf to finalize his religious education . He attended the lectures of the following marjas:
 Grand Ayatollah Mohsin Al-Hakim for dars-e-kharij of Fiqh
 Grand Ayatollah Sayyed Javad Tabrizi for dars-e-kharij of Kifaya-tul-Usool
 Grand Ayatollah Meerza Baqir Zanjani for dars-e-kharij of Usool-e-Fiqh
 Grand Ayatollah Bazurg Tehrani for Fehm-e-Hadees-o-Rajjal & Kutb Shanasi
 Grand Ayatollah Mahmood Shahroudi for dars-e-kharij of Fiqh
 Grand Ayatollah Abdul Aala Sabzwari for dars-e-kharij of Fiqh
 Grand Ayatollah Abul Qasim Rashti for Rasail-o-Makatib
 Grand Ayatollah Abdul Hussain Amini (the writer of famous Al-Ghadeer) for Ilm-e-Munazira
 Grand Ayatollah Mulla Sadra for Satheeyat & Asfar
 Grand Ayatollah Aqae Muhaqqiq for Darse Manzooma Sabzwari
 Grand Ayatollah Aqae Fazel for Ilm-e-Kalam
 Grand Ayatollah Abdul Karim Zanjani for Tanawwo dar Islami Uloom-o-Funoon and Ittehad-e-Islami
In an interview to the Hawza Elmiye Qom's monthly magazine "Hawza", he was asked:
Hawza Team: Hazrat, tell us about your education at Hawza Elmiye Najaf and your teachers there.
Ustad Najafi: My stay at Najaf was short ... I completed my education in 6 years ... At Najaf, the total number of courses I used to study and teach daily often reached up to ten. ... Once my teacher Grand Ayatollah Shaikh Jawad Tabrizi said to me in light mood:
"Why do you take so much strain, what is the logic in taking ten courses daily? Iranians say: 'The climate of Najaf is dry, thus taking one course in Najaf is not enough, but taking two courses is more than enough.'"
He wrote the following books during his stay at Najaf:
 Isbat ul-Imamat
 Tahqeeqat ul-Fariqain fi Hadis as-Saqlain
 Iqd ul-Juma'n (Translation of Mafatih al-Janan)
 A'dab ul-Mufeed wal Mustafeed (Translation of Munia tul-Murid)
 Faiz ur-Rehman (Translation of Lu'lu wal Marjan)
Grand Ayatollah Bazurg Tehrani has mentioned these books in his famous book Az-Zariya ila Tasaneef ush-Shia (A list of Shia Books), and Aalulbayt Global information Center has mentioned these books in their Musannifat-ush-Shia (Shia Books).
Najafi is fluent in Arabic, Persian, Punjabi and Urdu languages.

Ijtihad and Marjiyyat
He received ijazah's of ijtihad from following marjas of Hawza Elmiye Najaf, in 1960 AD (1379 AH):
 Grand Ayatollah Mohsin Al-Hakim
 Grand Ayatollah Sayyed Javad Tabrizi
 Grand Ayatollah Mara'shi Najafi
 Grand Ayatollah Meerza Baqir Zanjani
 Grand Ayatollah Bazurg Tehrani
 Grand Ayatollah Mahmood Shahroudi
 Grand Ayatollah Abdul Aala Sabzwari
 Grand Ayatollah Abul Qasim Rashti
 Grand Ayatollah Abdul Karim Zanjani
 Grand Ayatollah Najam ud-Din ash-Sharif as-Samarrai
 Grand Ayatollah Muhammad Raza al-Musavi
 Grand Ayatollah Muhammad Mahdi al-Kazmaini
 Grand Ayatollah Ahmed al-Mustanbit
He published his Tawzih ul Masail (treatise) named "Qawaneen ush-Sharia fi Fiqh-e-Jafariya" in 1980 AD (1400 AH). He is being followed by a number of Shia Muslims in matters of fiqh from Pakistan and abroad.

Clerical activities in Pakistan

Principal of Dar-ul-Uloom Muhammadia
After returning to Pakistan in 1960, Pir Fazal Shah (Parhezgar) asked him to become the principal of Dar-ul-Uloom Muhammadia, Sargodha, which he eagerly accepted.
In 1971, due to increased involvement in Majlis and Shia political movements it became impossible for him to run the affairs of Dar-ul-Uloom Muhammadia, therefore he stepped down from this post.

Participation in Shia educational affairs
In 1963, the principals of Shia madrasahs from all over Pakistan gathered in Karbala Gamey Shah, Lahore, and founded Tanzeeme Madarise Arabia Shia Pakistan (Organization of Shia Madrasahs of Pakistan). Ayatollah Najafi was elected its president.

In 1965, a high-level organization of Shia ulema Mautamar Ulemae Shia Pakistan (Conference of Shia Ulema of Pakistan) was formed with Ayatollah Najafi as its president. and Mufti Jafar Hussain as its patron. Other members included Allama Gulab Ali Shah, Allama Akhtar Abbas, Allama Hussain Bakhsh Jarra, Hafiz Saifullah Jafari, Allama Syed Safdar Hussain Najafi, Mufti Inayat Ali Shah, Allama Muhib Hussain, Allama Riaz Hussain Najafi and Allama Ghulam Hassan Jarra.

Participation in Shia politics
In 1964, Ayatollah Muhammad Hussain Najafi played a pivotal role in gathering about 250 Shia ulema and leaders in Imam Bargah Rizvia, Karachi, where "Shia Mutalbat Committee" was formed with Syed Muhammad Dehlavi as its president.

In 1978, after Zia ul Haq's announcement of promulgating Hanafi fiqh, Shia ulema and leaders gathered in Bhakkar and founded Tehrik-e-Nifaz-e-Fiqh-e-Jafaria (later called Tehrik-e-Jafaria Pakistan) with Mufti Jafar Hussain as its president. Ayatollah Najafi was a part of this organization's supreme council. After Mufti Jafar's demise, it was upon Ayatollah Najafi's recommendation that Allama Arif Hussain Hussaini was elected the new president of the organization.

Jamia Sultan ul-Madaris

In 1978, Raja Mumtaz Ali Khan gifted  land to Ayatollah Najafi for madrasah, on which Jamia Ilmia Sultan ul-Madaris al-Islamia was constructed.

In 2004, he founded Jamia Aqeela bani Hashim for the religious education of women.

He is also the patron of the following madrasahs:
 Madrasah Muhammadia, Sargodha
 Madrasah Ahya ul-Uloom Haideria, Mandi Bahauddin
 Madrasah Baqir ul-Uloom, Bhakkar
 Madrasah Wali ul-Asr, Jhang
 Madrasah Hazrat Amir ul-Momineen, Layyah
 Madrasah Jamia tul-Qaim, Layyah
 Madrasah Jafaria, Uch Sharif
 Madrasah Bab ul-Hussain, Dera Ismail Khan

Burning of library
After the publication of "Tajalliat-e-Sadaqat", which was written in response to the anti-Shia book "Aftab-e-Hidayat", his family library was set ablaze by followers of the sunni sect in Muharram 1983. He was in Quetta for reciting Majlis of Muharram.

Participation in 17th Islamic Unity Conference, Tehran

On the invitation of the Iranian Supreme Leader Grand Ayatollah Ali Khamenei, he attended the 17th Islamic Unity Conference in Tehran, Iran in May 2004.

He also visited Hawza Elmiye Qom, where he had meetings with Ayatollah Morteza Moghtadai, Grand Ayatollah Hossein Noori Hamedani and Grand Ayatollah Naser Makarem Shirazi. He was interviewed by the state television and the Hawza Elmiye Qom's official magazine Hawza.

Participation in 21st Islamic Unity Conference, Tehran
On the invitation of the Iranian Supreme Leader Grand Ayatollah Ali Khamenei, he attended the 21st Islamic Unity Conference in Tehran, Iran in May 2008, along with Allama Sajid Naqvi, Shaikh Mohsin Najafi, Hafiz Riaz Hussain Najafi and Maulana Sami ul Haq.

He also visited Hawza Elmiye Qom, where he had meetings with Ayatollah Jafar Subhani, Grand Ayatollah Mohammad Shahroudi, Grand Ayatollah Mousa Shubairi Zanjani, Grand Ayatollah Qorban Ali Kaboli, Ayatollah Ahmed Mobalighi and Grand Ayatollah Naser Makarem Shirazi. He also addressed a gathering arranged in memory of Shaikh Aktar Abbas Najafi and Shaheed Ghulam Hussain Najafi in Madrasah Hojatieh, Hawza Elmiye Qom.

Majalis and Q&A sessions

For past thirty years, he has been addressing Majlis in almost all parts of Punjab, Pakistan. For the last five years he has been addressing Majlis in Imambargah Shah Gardez, Multan where all the major Shia ulema address majalis before him, including Allama Akhter Abbas Naseem, Principal of Madrasah Jamia tus-Saqlain, Multan. Last year the famous Ayatollah Syed Aqeel-ul-Gharavi also addressed majalis at the same place.

He has also been addressing post-Muharram Majlis in Islamabad and Birmingham, England for many years.

After his Majlis, questions pertaining to fiqh, aqaid and tafsir are put before him from the gathering. He gives answers to these questions with references from Quran and Hadith of The Fourteen Infallibles. At certain occasions, these Q&A sessions have spanned hours.

Books

Faizan ur-Rahman fi Tafsir ul-Quran
It is a 10-volume comprehensive Tafsir of Quran.

Masail ush-Sharia (Translation of Wasael ush-Shia)
It is the Urdu translation of the great Shia book of Hadith Wasael ush-Shia by Shaikh al-Hur al-Aamili. 13 volumes out of 20 have been published.
Kawakib-e-Muzayya (Translation of Al-Jawahar as-Sunnia fil-Ahadees-al-Qudsia)
It is the Urdu translation & explanation of Shaikh al-Hur al-Aamili's book on Hadith Qudsi.

Ahsan ul-Fawaid fi Sharh al-Aqaid
It is a 2-volume Urdu translation & explanation of Sheikh Saduq's famous Risala "Al-Aqaid". It contains all the Shia beliefs, and their truthfulness in the light of Quran and Hadith.
Usool ush-Sharia fi Aqaid ush-Shia
This book discusses the beliefs of Ghali's, Tafwizi's and Shaykhi's (which they have spread in the name of Shia Islam), and negates them in the light of Quran and Hadith.
Aitaqadat-e-Imamia
It is the Urdu translation & explanation of Allama Majlisi's "Risala tul-Lailia".
Aqsam-e-Tauheed
Mukhtasir Aqaid ush-Shia

Qawaneen ush-Sharia fi Fiqh-e-Jafariya (Tawzih ul-Masail)
It is a 2-volume fiqhi book, covering all the aspects of human life according to Jafari Jurisprudence, including the modern human issues. T
Khulasa tul-Ahkam
It is an abridged version of Qawaneen ush-Sharia.
Hurmat-e-Ghina Aur Islam
This book discusses the hurmat of ghina in Islamic Sharia.
Hurmat-e-Reeshtarashi
This book discusses the hurmat of shaving beard in Islamic Sharia.
Namaz-e-Juma Aur Islam
It is a book which attempts to prove that Juma Prayers are wajib even in Imam Mahdi's Ghaibat. It was published by Syed Muhammad Dehlavi in Karachi.

Iqd ul-Juma'n (Translation of Mafatih al-Janan)
Ayatollah Najafi translated Mafatih al-Janan during his stay at Najaf, but did not publish it as another translation was published from Lahore.
Grand Ayatollah Bazurg Tehrani has mentioned it in his famous book "Az-Zariya ila Tasaneef ush-Shia" (A list of Shia Books), and Grand Ayatollah Hussaini in his book "Ziyarat".
Zaad-ul-Ibad li-youmil-Ma'ad
It is a collection of supplications from reliable Shia books.

Saadat ud-Darain fi Maqtal al-Hussain
It is a comprehensive account of the Battle of Karbala in 61 AH and the tragic martyrdom of Husayn ibn Ali, all narrated from reliable sources only.
Faiz ur-Rehman (Translation of Lu'lu wal Marjan)
Ayatollah Najafi translated Allama Noori's famous book Lu'lu wal Marjan during his stay at Najaf, but did not publish it as another translation "Jawahir ul-Bayan" was published from Sargodha.
Grand Ayatollah Bazurg Tehrani has mentioned it in his famous book "Az-Zariya ila Tasaneef ush-Shia" (A list of Shia Books), and has written that its foreword about hurmat of ghina is indeed useful.
Shuhda-e-Khamsa kay Haalat-e-Zindagi
It contains biographies of the five martyr Shia ulema:
 Shaheed-e-Awal Muhammad Jamal uddin Makki Amili
 Shaheed-e-Sani Zain uddin Amili
 Shaheed-e-Salis Qazi Nurullah Shustari
 Shaheed-e-Rabey Mirza Muhammad Kamil Dehlavi
 Shaheed-e-Khamis Mohammad Baqir al-Sadr

Isbat ul-Imamat
It is a book on the issue of Khilafat & Imamat, and establishes that Imam Ali was the true successor to Muhammad.Grand Ayatollah Bazurg Tehrani has mentioned it in his famous book "Az-Zariya ila Tasaneef ush-Shia" (A list of Shia Books).
Tahqeeqat ul-Fariqain fi Hadis as-Saqlain
It is a book presenting extensive research from both the Shia & Sunni books of Hadith, as regards the truthfulness of Hadith of the two weighty things (Hadis as-Saqlain).Grand Ayatollah Bazurg Tehrani has mentioned it in his famous book "Az-Zariya ila Tasaneef ush-Shia" (A list of Shia Books).
Tajalliat-e-Sadaqat fi Jawab Aftab-e-Hidayat
It is a 2-volume book in response to the anti-Shia book "Aftab-e-Hidayat" by Maulvi Karam Deen.
Tanzeeh ul-Imamia amma fi Risala Mazhab ush-Sha
It is the book in response to the anti-Shia risala "Mazhab ush-Shia" by Pir Siyyalvi.
Khatm-e-Nabuwwat bar Khatmi Martabat
This book attempts to prove Khatme Nabuwwat (i.e. Prophethood has come to an end after Muhammad.)

A'dab ul-Mufeed wal Mustafeed (Translation of Munia tul-Murid)
Ayatollah Najafi translated Shaheed-e-Sani's famous book Munia tul-Murid during his stay at Najaf, but did not publish it as another translation by Mufti Inayat Ali Shah was published.
Grand Ayatollah Bazurg Tehrani has mentioned it in his famous book "Az-Zariya ila Tasaneef ush-Shia" (A list of Shia Books).
Islah ul-Majalis wal-Mahafil
This book discuss the wrong customs associated with Majlis of Imam Hussain, and how to correct them.
Islah ur-Rusoom az-Zahira ba Kalam al-Itrat at-Tahira
It is a comprehensive book discussing all the bid‘ah's and perceived false customs in Islamic society, and how to correct them.

See also

 Hawza
 List of Ayatollahs
 List of Marjas
 List of Shi'a books 
 List of Shi'a Muslim scholars of Islam
 Marjas
 Muhsin al-Hakim
 Mirza Javad Tabrizi
 Resalah
 Five Martyrs of Shia Islam
 The Four Books
 Wasā'il al-Shīʿa

References

Bibliography

External links
 
 Biography
 "Tawzih-ul-Masail" online
 Read books online
 Watch videos of Majalis & Q&A Sessions
 Watch videos of 2009 Birmingham Majalis & Q&A Sessions
 Downnload Audio Majalis & Q&A Sessions

1939 births
Living people
People from Khanewal District
Pakistani grand ayatollahs
Pakistani clergy
Pakistani Shia Muslims
Punjabi people
Pakistani Shia clerics